Edmund Francis MacDonald (May 7, 1908 – September 2, 1951) was an American actor.

Early years
MacDonald was born in Boston. He had one brother.

Career
MacDonald gained early acting experience in stock theater on Long Island. He made his Broadway debut in Getting Even (1929). His other Broadway credits include Her Tin Soldier (1933) and I, Myself (1934).

In 1938, he was a regular on Hollywood Showcase, an old-time radio variety show.  MacDonald was also a regular on the Alan Ladd radio program "Box 13".

MacDonald worked primarily as a character actor in B films. He appeared in films such as Call of the Canyon 1942, The Mantrap 1943, and Detour 1945. His last film was Red Canyon in 1949.

Death
MacDonald suffered a stroke while at home at age 42 and was hospitalized; later he died of a brain hemorrhage at the Veterans' Administration Hospital in Los Angeles. He was interred at Los Angeles National Cemetery.

Filmography

References

External links

1908 births
1951 deaths
20th-century American male actors